Al Coates may refer to:

 Al Coates (broadcaster), Canadian sports broadcaster
 Al Coates (ice hockey) (born 1945), National Hockey League executive

See also
Albert Coates (disambiguation)